Leightonfield railway station is located on the Main South line, serving the Sydney suburb of Villawood. It is served by Sydney Trains T3 Bankstown line services.

History
Leightonfield station opened on 24 August 1942 to service the adjacent munitions factory. It was transferred from Federal to State Government ownership on 1 February 1962.

To the south of the station lies the Southern Sydney Freight Line that opened in January 2013.

Platforms and services
Historically Leightonfield was served by services from the city and Lidcombe operating to Liverpool. This changed in the early 2000s, when most services to Liverpool were altered to operate via Bankstown. Today Leightonfield is served by T3 Bankstown line services terminating at Liverpool and three Liverpool – City via Strathfield services on weekdays. The NSW Government Future Transport Strategy (Our vision for transport in NSW) released in September 2022 shows Leightonfield and the Villawood freight intermodal (instead of Birrong) as the interchange between the T3 Bankstown Line branches to Lidcombe and Liverpool.

Transport links
Leightonfield station is served by one NightRide route:
N50: Liverpool station to Town Hall station

References

External links

Leightonfield station details Transport for New South Wales

Railway stations in Sydney
Railway stations in Australia opened in 1942
Main Southern railway line, New South Wales
City of Fairfield